Aleksandr Vasilyevich Tkachyov  (born 4 November 1957) is a former Soviet/Russian gymnast and two times Olympic Champion. He trained in Dynamo, Voronezh. His trainer was USSR national Pyotr Fyodorovich Korchagin. Tkachev was one of the world's strongest gymnasts between 1977 and 1981. In 1977 Tkachev performed for the first time a gymnastics element on the Horizontal Bar, which was later named Tkachev after him and became one of the most popular and impressive elements, frequently used on international gymnastics competitions. In 2005–2006, he coached Girls' Compulsory Program at Peninsula Gymnastics in San Mateo, California.

Achievements (non-Olympic)

Gallery

External links
 
 List of competitive results at Gymn Forum
 Tkachev Element animated gif image
 Tkachev(High Bar Animation)

1957 births
Russian male artistic gymnasts
Soviet male artistic gymnasts
Gymnasts at the 1980 Summer Olympics
Olympic gymnasts of the Soviet Union
Medalists at the 1980 Summer Olympics
Olympic medalists in gymnastics
Olympic gold medalists for the Soviet Union
Olympic silver medalists for the Soviet Union
World champion gymnasts
Medalists at the World Artistic Gymnastics Championships
Dynamo sports society athletes
Originators of elements in artistic gymnastics
People from Voronezh Oblast
Living people
European champions in gymnastics
Sportspeople from Voronezh Oblast